Maxine Mitchell (July 22, 1917 – November 7, 1991) was an American fencer. Undefeated in the 1955 U.S. individual women's national championship, she competed in the women's individual foil event at four Olympic Games.

References

External links
 

1917 births
1991 deaths
American female foil fencers
Olympic fencers of the United States
Fencers at the 1952 Summer Olympics
Fencers at the 1956 Summer Olympics
Fencers at the 1960 Summer Olympics
Fencers at the 1968 Summer Olympics
Sportspeople from Washington (state)
Pan American Games medalists in fencing
Pan American Games gold medalists for the United States
Pan American Games silver medalists for the United States
Fencers at the 1963 Pan American Games
Medalists at the 1963 Pan American Games
20th-century American women